Colin Eric Richardson (born 24 November 1958 in London) is a former motorcycle speedway rider who won the National League Riders Championship in 1977. He represented England at full and Under-21 levels. He rode for the Eastbourne Eagles, Reading Racers, Swindon Robins, Hull Vikings, Wimbledon Dons (where he won The Laurels on his home track in 1977) and the King's Lynn Stars winning the New National League KO Cup in 1975 and the National League and cup double in 1977 with Eastbourne.

His son Lee Richardson was a speedway rider and had represented Great Britain, and was a former Speedway Grand Prix rider.  On 13 May 2012 his son died of internal bleeding in a Wrocław hospital following a collision with a safety fence during a Polish League match.

References

1958 births
Living people
British speedway riders
King's Lynn Stars riders
Eastbourne Eagles riders
Wimbledon Dons riders
Reading Racers riders
Swindon Robins riders
Hull Vikings riders